Nicolas Kintz (born 1 September 1977) is a French former swimmer who competed in the 2000 Summer Olympics and in the 2004 Summer Olympics.

References

1977 births
Living people
Sportspeople from Épinal
French male freestyle swimmers
Olympic swimmers of France
Swimmers at the 2000 Summer Olympics
Swimmers at the 2004 Summer Olympics
European Aquatics Championships medalists in swimming
Georgia Bulldogs men's swimmers
Mediterranean Games silver medalists for France
Mediterranean Games bronze medalists for France
Mediterranean Games medalists in swimming
Swimmers at the 2001 Mediterranean Games
20th-century French people
21st-century French people